The Jacqueline Kennedy Onassis School at American Ballet Theatre (ABT/JKO School) is the associate school of American Ballet Theatre located at 890 Broadway, within the Flatiron District of Manhattan, New York City. The school comprises a children's division for ages 4 to 12, a pre-professional division for ages 12 to 18, and the preparatory program "Studio Company" for ages 16 to 20. It was established in 2004 and named in honor of Jacqueline Kennedy Onassis who served on ABT's Board of Trustees as honorary chairman emerita for many years prior to her death. Besides its parent company, graduates of JKO have found employment in various companies, such as National Ballet of Canada, The Royal Ballet, Joffrey Ballet and Dutch National Ballet. Stella Abrera will become the school's interim artistic director for a year, starting in August 2022, following Cynthia Harvey's departure in May.

Education and training
Due to ABT's vast repertoire, JKO's training curriculum aims to provide its students the ability to adapt to all styles and techniques of dance. The training curriculum combines elements from the classic French, Russian, and Italian styles of training, and it encompasses classical ballet technique, pointe, partnering, character, modern technique, variations and pilates. Students also participate in the "JKO Wellness Lecture Series", which educates the dancers on topics such as Nutrition, Women's Health, Stress Management, Strength Training, Resume Writing and Career Preparation. Each spring all ABT JKO students perform in 1 annual performance of ABT repertory and original choreography created by the faculty. Select students are chosen for other various performances throughout the year and are also given the opportunity to perform in ABT's production of The Nutcracker.

Studio Company
ABT Studio Company, formerly known as ABT II, is a small company of 12 young dancers, ranging from ages 16 to 20, handpicked by ABT. It is currently an extension of the ABT JKO school. These dancers are trained in the program to join ABT's main company or other leading professional companies, and the program is described by ABT as "a bridge between ballet training and professional performance". While the dancers study intensively and learn the company repertoire, they also gain various performance experiences via cultural exchanges, regional touring, and residencies. All of the dancers learn Alexei Ratmansky's The Nutcracker, and a select group are chosen to perform the ballet when the company holds performances at Brooklyn Academy of Music.

Notable alumni
 Kelly Bishop
 Isabella Boylston
 Dusty Button
 Herman Cornejo
 Michaela DePrince
 David Hallberg
 Yuriko Kajiya
 Hee Seo
 Cory Stearns
 Devon Teuscher

Faculty

 Olga Dvorovenko
 Julie Kent
 Lupe Serrano
 Raymond Lukens
 Franco De Vita
 Gennadi Saveliev
 Kevin McKenzie
 Carlos Lopez
 Clarice Marshall
 Keith Sabado
 Jessica Lang
 Kate Lydon
 Martine van Hamel

Summer Intensive
ABT offers a five-week program designed to develop well-rounded, versatile dancers. It combines various disciplines, with an emphasis on classical ballet and ABT's "National Training Curriculum".

References

External links

Ballet schools in the United States
Dance education in the United States
Dance in New York City
Jacqueline Kennedy Onassis School